Amy F.T. Arnsten is an American neuroscientist. She is the Albert E. Kent Professor of Neuroscience and Professor of Psychology as well as a member of the Kavli Institute of Neuroscience at Yale University.

Research
She studies the unique molecular mechanisms that govern the higher cortical circuits that govern cognition, and the alterations that can lead to cognitive disorders. She has discovered how exposure to uncontrollable stress causes the prefrontal cortex to go "off-line", and how dysregulation of stress signaling pathways with advancing age confers vulnerability to tau pathology, e.g. in Alzheimer's disease. Her work has identified mechanisms to protect and strengthen prefrontal cortex, leading to the successful translation of two treatments currently in clinical use: guanfacine for disorders of the prefrontal cortex such as ADHD and autism, and prazosin for treating PTSD.

Education
Arnsten grew up in Maplewood, New Jersey and graduated from Columbia High School in 1972. She received a bachelor's degree in neuroscience from Brown University in 1976, where she was the first to create the neuroscience major, and a PhD in neuroscience from UC San Diego in 1981. She completed postdoctoral research at Cambridge University with Susan Iversen and at Yale University with Patricia Goldman-Rakic.

Recognition
In 2008, Arnsten received the Distinguished Investigator Award from the National Alliance for Research on Schizophrenia and Depression, to further her research on the neurobiology of mental illness. In 2013, she was given the National Institutes of Health Director's Pioneer Award in recognition of her groundbreaking research. In 2015, she won the Goldman-Rakic Prize for Outstanding Achievement in Cognitive Neuroscience from the Brain and Behavior Research Foundation.

Arnsten was elected to the National Institute of Medicine in 2017. She studies the molecular mechanisms underlying cognition and cognitive disorders, and the ways in which the pre-frontal cortex responds to stress. Her research has led to two treatments currently in use: guanfacine for disorders such as ADHD and autism, and prazosin for treating PTSD.

Arnsten was featured in a 2019 HBO documentary by Sanjay Gupta and Marc Levin called One Nation Under Stress.

References

External links 

 

Yale University faculty
Members of the National Academy of Medicine
Brown University alumni
American neuroscientists
American women neuroscientists
Living people
Columbia High School (New Jersey) alumni
People from Maplewood, New Jersey
Scientists from New Jersey
Year of birth missing (living people)
American women academics
21st-century American women